Thomas Young Allen (1852 – April 7, 1933) was an American politician who served in the Virginia House of Delegates.

References

External links 

1852 births
1933 deaths
Members of the Virginia House of Delegates
19th-century American politicians